John Gascoigne (by 1537–1602), of Parlington, Yorkshire, was an English politician.

He was a Member (MP) of the Parliament of England for Aldborough in 1558.

References

1602 deaths
Members of the Parliament of England for constituencies in Yorkshire
People from Aberford
English MPs 1558
Year of birth uncertain